F75 or F-75 may refer to :
 F-75 (food), a therapeutic milk product designed to treat severe malnutrition
 Daihatsu Rugger F75, the long wheelbase first generation model of the off-road vehicle built between 1984 and 1992
 HMS Charybdis (F75), a 1968 British Royal Navy Leander-class frigate 
 HMS Eskimo (F75), a 1938 British Royal Navy Tribal-class destroyer
 HMS Mooltan (F75), a 1939 British Royal Navy armed merchant cruiser
 Nikon F75, an SLR camera
 Spanish frigate Extremadura F75, a 1972 Baleares-class frigate of the Spanish Navy